Thomas Harrison may refer to:
Thomas Harrison (architect) (1744–1829), English architect and bridge engineer
Thomas Harrison (cyclist) (born 1942), Australian cyclist
Thomas Harrison (footballer) (1867–1942), English footballer for Aston Villa
Thomas Harrison (general) (1823–1891), Confederate States Army brigadier general, district judge
Thomas Harrison (minister) (1619–1682), English nonconformist minister, active in Virginia and Ireland
Thomas Harrison (ship-owner) (1815–1888), Liverpool ship-owner
Thomas Harrison (soldier) (1606–1660), sided with Parliament in the English Civil War
Thomas Harrison (translator) (1555–1631), English Puritan scholar and a translator for the King James Version of the Bible
T. Alexander Harrison (1853–1930), American artist
Thomas Elliot Harrison (1808–1888), civil engineer
Thomas Sinclair Harrison (1898–?), South African World War I flying ace
Thomas W. Harrison (1856–1935), U.S. Representative from Virginia (second name Walter; had a cousin Thomas Willoughby Harrison (1824–1910) West Virginia judge
Tom Harrison (baseball) (born 1945), baseball pitcher
Tom Harrison (cricketer) (born 1971), English cricketer
Tom Harrison (musician) (born 1985), British jazz musician
Tom Harrison (politician) (1864–1944), Australian politician
Tommy Harrison (1892–1931), English boxer of the 1900s-1920s 
Tommy Harrison (footballer) (born 1974), Scottish footballer for Heart of Midlothian

See also
Tom Harrisson (1911–1976), British polymath
Thomas Harrison (ship), used to transport free settlers and convicts from Ireland and England to Australia and New Zealand from 1835 to 1842